Camp Justice (also known as Camp Al-Adala) was a joint Iraqi-U.S. military base in the Kadhimiya district of Baghdad, Iraq.

Etymology
The location was renamed from "Camp Banzai" in mid-September 2004 as part of an effort to give Army facilities around Baghdad friendlier names.

History
Camp Justice was the location of the 2006 execution of Saddam Hussein; the 2007 hanging of Barzan Ibrahim al-Tikriti, Awad Hamed al-Bandar, and Taha Yassin Ramadan; and the 2010 hanging of Saddam's cousin Ali Hassan al-Majid, a.k.a. Chemical Ali.

The former president of Iraq, Saddam Hussein was executed at approximately 03:00 UTC on December 30, 2006. Two weeks later on January 15, 2007, Barzan Ibrahim al-Tikriti, former head of the Iraqi Intelligence Service, and Awad Hamed al-Bandar, former head of the Iraqi Revolutionary Court, were also executed by hanging at this site.

Saddam's former deputy and former vice-president, Taha Yassin Ramadan (who was originally sentenced to life in prison on November 5, 2006, but had it changed to a death sentence three months and a week later), was likewise hanged here on March 20, 2007, two months and five days after Barzan's and al-Bandar's execution.  Likewise Saddam's cousin Ali Hassan al-Majid (Chemical Ali) was hanged on January 25, 2010 (three years and about a month after his cousin's execution), after receiving four death sentences.

Correctional facilities
Women on Iraq's death row are held at the Shaaba Khamsa death row facility at Camp Justice. As of 2014 the adult women's death row had 36 women as well as children even though the facility was only intended to hold 25 women.

References

Justice